SwisTrack is a tool for tracking robots, humans, animals and objects using a camera or a recorded video as input source. It uses Intel's OpenCV library for fast image processing and contains interfaces for USB, FireWire and GigE cameras, as well as AVI files.

The architecture of SwisTrack is flexible to allow the user to track (marked and marker-less) objects in many situations. So-called components are stuck together within the component pipeline (like Lego bricks) and configured. Each component then performs one processing step, which can be visualized in real-time. SwisTrack already comes with a series of components, but for specialized tasks, programmers are free to implement their own components. Position and trajectory information can be retrieved via TCP/IP in NMEA 0183 format. Such data can easily be recorded for post-processing, or used in a real-time fashion.

SwisTrack has mainly been developed by the Distributed Intelligent Systems and Algorithms Laboratory (DISAL) and the LPM Vision Group at EPFL in Lausanne, Switzerland.

References
 SwisTrack: A Tracking Tool for Multi-Unit Robotic and Biological Systems
 SwisTrack - A Flexible Open Source Tracking Software for Multi-Agent Systems

External links

 SwisTrack documentation
 SwarmBots project
 The European Project LEURRE
 Tracking of corn borer larvae

Robotics software
Free software programmed in C++
Software that uses wxWidgets
2008 software
2008 in robotics